NGC 215 is a lenticular galaxy located in the constellation Phoenix. It was discovered on October 28, 1834 by John Herschel.

References

0215
Phoenix
Lenticular galaxies
Astronomical objects discovered in 1834
002451
Discoveries by John Herschel
ESO objects